Elections were held in the organized municipalities in the Algoma District of Ontario on October 27, 2014 in conjunction with municipal elections across the province.

Blind River

Bruce Mines

Dubreuilville

Elliot Lake
The election in Elliot Lake was significantly impacted by the Algo Centre Mall roof collapse of 2012, and the release of the judicial inquiry's report into the incident just 12 days before the election. Incumbent mayor Rick Hamilton and two incumbent city councillors who ran against him for the mayoralty were all defeated by political newcomer Dan Marchisella, and only one seat on city council was won by an incumbent councillor. Marchisella is also the first mayor in the city's history to have been born in the city.

Hilton

Hilton Beach

Hornepayne

Huron Shores

Jocelyn

Johnson

Laird

Macdonald, Meredith and Aberdeen Additional

North Shore

Plummer Additional

Prince

Sault Ste. Marie

Spanish

St. Joseph

Tarbutt

Thessalon

Wawa

White River

References

Results

Algoma
Algoma District